Ferndale High School is the name of several high schools in the United States:
Ferndale Area Junior/Senior High School in Johnstown, Pennsylvania
Ferndale High School (California) in Ferndale, California
Ferndale High School (Washington)
Ferndale High School (Michigan)

There is also the fictitious:
Ferndale High School in the New Zealand television series Shortland Street